Affairs Council may refer to:

 General Affairs and External Affairs Council, one of the oldest configurations of the Council of the European Union
 Mainland Affairs Council, a cabinet-level administrative agency under the Executive Yuan of the Republic of China
 Minnesota Indian Affairs Council, a liaison between the government of Minnesota and the Native American tribes in the state of Minnesota

See also

 Public Affairs Council (disambiguation)
 World Affairs Council (disambiguation)